Jerca Vodušek Starič (born 1950) is a Slovene historian. She received a bachelor's degree in history at the Faculty of Arts of the University of Ljubljana, a master's degree in 1979, and a PhD in 1991.

Her field of expertise is Slovene and European history. Her focus is the government takeover by the communists in Yugoslavia after World War II. Currently she is a professor of modern history at the Faculty of Arts in Maribor. From 2005 to 2008, she was the director of the Institute of Contemporary History in Ljubljana.

Publications
Jerca Vodušek Starič, Začetki samoupravljanja v Sloveniji : 1949-1953. Maribor, 1983; 
Jerca Vodušek Starič, Prevzem oblasti 1944-1946. Ljubljana, 1992; 
Jerca Vodušek Starič, "Dosje" Mačkovšek. Ljubljana, 1994. 
Jerca Vodušek Starič, Slovenski špijoni in SOE : 1938-1942. Ljubljana, 2002; 
Jerca Vodušek Starič, Kako su komunisti osvojili vlast: 1944.-1946. Zagreb, 2006; 
Jerca Vodušek Starič, "The Making of the Communist Regime in Slovenia and Yugoslavia" in Crimes Committed by Totalitarian Regimes: Reports and Proceedings of the 8 April European Public Hearing on Crimes Committed by Totalitarian Regimes (ed: Peter Jambrek), pp 25–35. Ljubljana, 2008;

References

1950 births
Living people
University of Ljubljana alumni
20th-century Slovenian historians
Academic staff of the University of Maribor
Place of birth missing (living people)
21st-century Slovenian historians